The 1982–83 Just Juice National Basketball League season was the eleventh season of the National Basketball League formed in 1972.

The league was sponsored by Just Juice for the second consecutive year and Crystal Palace won yet another league title but Sunderland claimed the Play Off's and the Solent Stars successfully defended their National Cup crown.The league received a welcome boost when a new national TV channel called  Channel 4 decided to show live action every Monday evening.

Team changes
Leicester returned to top tier action as the one new team admitted to the expanded 13 team first division which retained the previous twelve members. Team Talbot, Guildford Pirates moved to Bracknell and became the Bracknell Pirates. Sunderland Saints became Sunderland Maestros towards the end of the season following a new two year sponsorship deal with a North East car dealer.
The leagues most famous player Alton Byrd left Crystal Palace to join Murray International Edinburgh.

League standings

First Division

Second Division

Just Juice playoffs

Semi-finals

Final
Paul Stimpson landed a basket for the Crystal Palace Supersonics which was adjudged to be just after the buzzer. It would have won the game for Palace but the game went into overtime and Sunderland won an incredible match.

Asda National Cup

Second round

Quarter-finals

Semi-finals

Final
Birmingham's Russ Saunders an imported American scored a record 43 points in a final but still found himself on the losing side.

References

See also
Basketball in England
British Basketball League
English Basketball League
List of English National Basketball League seasons

National Basketball League (England) seasons
 
British